Quarters! is the sixth studio album by Australian psychedelic rock band King Gizzard & the Lizard Wizard. It was released on 1 May 2015 on Heavenly Records, peaking at No. 99 on the ARIA Charts.

The album was nominated for Best Jazz Album at the ARIA Music Awards of 2015, losing to Barney McAll for Mooroolbark.

Background 
The album features four songs, each running for ten minutes and ten seconds making each song a quarter of the album - hence the title. Drawing upon jazz-fusion and psychedelic rock, the album's more laid-back sound was described as "unlike anything they’ve released before" and as "an album more likely to get your head bobbing and hips shaking as opposed to losing footwear in a violent mosh".

Stu Mackenzie described how the composition of the album came around in an interview in 2015:

"I wanted to make a record where I didn’t have to yell, as well as exploring some longer, repetitive song structures.” Four tracks, four quarters, each one precisely 10:10 minutes long, each one an extended jam teeming with melodies, the occasional trickle of water, space funk, laughter like Pink Floyd and deliciously unfussy grooves. I also didn’t want to use any brutal guitar pedals or sing through blown-out guitar amps as I usually would."

Reception 

Upon its release, Quarters! received generally positive reviews by music critics. At Metacritic, which assigns a normalized rating out of 100 to reviews from critics, the album received an average score of 68, based on 8 reviews, indicating "generally favorable".

Writing for The Guardian, Everett True claimed during the album that "King Gizzard & the Lizard Wizard unravel mysteries, perform magic, tease melodies out of intricately formed musical patterns and do it all with a face that would be straight except it’s taken too many mind-altering substances."

Music 
The album consists of four psychedelic pop songs, all running exactly ten minutes and ten seconds. "The River" is a Traffic-style jazz-rock song with Santana-esque congas.

Tim Sendra of AllMusic described the album as a "jazz-prog epic." Mike Katzif of NPR described the album's music as "jazz-inflected prog rock."

Track listing 
Vinyl releases have tracks 1–2 on Side A, and tracks 3–4 on Side B.

Personnel 
Credits for Quarters! adapted from liner notes.

King Gizzard & the Lizard Wizard
Michael Cavanagh – drums, conga
Cook Craig – guitar
Ambrose Kenny-Smith – harmonica, vocals
Stu Mackenzie – vocals, guitar
Eric Moore – drums, percussion
Lucas Skinner – bass
Joey Walker – guitar, bass

Production
Stu Mackenzie – recording (track 2), additional recording, mixing
Wayne Gordon – recording (tracks 1, 3, 4)
Joe Carra – mastering
Jason Galea – cover, layout, photo

Charts

References

External links
 

2015 albums
King Gizzard & the Lizard Wizard albums
ATO Records albums
Flightless (record label) albums
Psychedelic pop albums
Progressive rock albums by Australian artists
Jazz fusion albums by Australian artists